The Menhir of Beisenerbierg is a three-metre-tall standing stone which stands on a hilltop at Reckange in the Grand Duchy of Luxembourg. An excavation in 2001 revealed its age to be Neolithic.

Description
The standing stone, or "menhir", is 3 metres high, 0.7 metres wide, and weighs around 4 tonnes. It is made from sandstone and owes its yellow-brown colour to its high iron content. It appears to have been shaped to give it an "anthropomorphic" form.

History
The stone was buried for centuries until 1978 when it was identified by members of the "Friends of Old Mersch" association. It was re-erected 30 metres from its original location. In 2001, an archaeological excavation was undertaken by the National Museum. The excavations which uncovered the original foundation pit confirmed the antiquity of this megalithic monument, and showed it to be Neolithic.

References

Archaeological sites in Luxembourg
Mersch